Katherine, Crown Princess of Yugoslavia (née Batis, ; born 13 November 1943 in Athens), is the wife of Alexander, Crown Prince of Yugoslavia.

Biography
She is one of the two daughters of Robert Batis (1916–2011) and Anna Dosti (1922–2010). Her sister is Betty Roumeliotis (née Batis). Katherine was educated in Athens and in Lausanne, Switzerland. She studied business at the University of Denver and the University of Dallas. She worked in business for several years in the United States.

On 25 November 1962, Katherine married Jack Walter Andrews (1933–2013), the son of Walter Andrews and Elizabeth Pifer. They had two children and divorced in 1984. Katherine has traveled extensively and has lived in Australia, Africa and the United States.

Her son David and her grandson Alexander are godchildren of former President of Greece, Prokopis Pavlopoulos.

She met her second husband in Washington DC in 1984, and they were married in London, civilly on 20 September 1985 and religiously the next day at the St. Sava Serbian Orthodox Church, Notting Hill. Their best man was Constantine II of Greece, and the witness was Prince Tomislav of Yugoslavia, Crown Prince Alexander's uncle.

She has dedicated much of her time to charitable activities since the conflict in the former Yugoslavia. She works in humanitarian relief, and is the patron of various humanitarian organizations including Lifeline Humanitarian Organization. In 2001 she established The HRH Crown Princess Katherine Foundation in Belgrade, in order to expand her charitable works.

In 1991, the Crown Prince traveled to Belgrade with his wife and sons. They were enthusiastically greeted by hundreds of thousands of supporters, many of whom advocated making the Karađorđević family the head of a constitutional parliamentary monarchy.

On 17 July 2001, after the democratic revolution in Serbia, the Crown Prince and Crown Princess took up residence in the Royal Palace in Belgrade.

Katherine speaks Greek, English, French, some Spanish, and now Serbian. She enjoys music, reading, cooking, theater and cross-country skiing.

In 2019, Katherine celebrated 25 years of Lifeline Humanitarian Organisation in London. The event was held at the Claridge's hotel in Mayfair, the birthplace of her husband. The event was organised by board member Lazar Vukovic. Katherine was presented with an award for 25 years of patronage amongst distinguished guests.

Honours

Dynastic
  House of Karađorđević: Knight Grand Cordon of the Royal Order of Saint Sava, Special Class

Foreign
 : Recipient of the 50th Birthday Medal of King Carl XVI Gustaf
 : Recipient of the 70th Birthday Badge Medal of King Carl XVI Gustaf

Awards
 Honorary Degree as Doctor of Letters of the University of Sheffield
 Serbian Orthodox Church: Member of the Decoration of Emperor Constantine the Great
 Caritas in Veritate International: Pope Francis Award for Charity & Leadership.
 Russian Orthodox Church in America: Member of the Decoration of Merit.
 Ambassador of Good Service Order.
 Greek Society for the Maintenance of Traditional Architectural Heritage: Gold Humanitarian Award.
 Tesla Science Foundation Philadelphia: Member of the Order of Nikola Testa.
 Books for Peace International Award.

Arms

Universal arms of wife of crown prince of Serbia and thus derived from crown princes's arms. The red losange the white double-headed eagle in flight, both heads crowned with heraldic crown Serbia, beak, tongue and feet of gold on the chest eagle red shield with a cross to the edge between which are the coat working surfaces facing the vertical shaft baptism all white in bottom shield two golden lily. The shield is crowned with a crown of HRH King Peter I with a lily blue in the center.

Patronages

Foreign
 : Patron of the Veuve Clicquot Business Woman Award

References

Note

External links
Official biography of HRH The Crown Princess
Royal Mausoleum Oplenac
Lifeline Humanitarian Organization
Lifeline Humanitarian Organization Chicago
Royal Family

1943 births
Living people
Nobility from Athens
University of Colorado alumni
University of Dallas alumni
Yugoslav princesses
Recipients of the Order of St. Sava
Grand Crosses of the Order of St. Sava